Lou Esposito is an American football coach and former player.  He is the defensive coordinator at Western Michigan University in Kalamazoo, Michigan.  From 2005 to 2009, Esposito was the head football coach at Saint Joseph's College in Rensselaer, Indiana, where he compiled a record of 29–25. In 2016, he served as the first head coach in the history of Davenport University, finishing with a record of 6–5 in his one season at the helm before accepting a position at Western Michigan.

Playing career 
Esposito graduated in 1995 from Manalapan High School in Manalapan Township, New Jersey, where he played football and wrestled. He played college football at the University of Memphis, where he was a four-year letterman from 1997 to 2000.

Following his time at Memphis, Esposito played two seasons with the Memphis Xplorers, a professional arena football team in the AF2 league. His roommate during those years was Tim Lester, who had played quarterback at Western Michigan.

Coaching career 
Esposito began his coaching career with the Xplorers in 2003, then left in 2004 to become defensive coordinator at Saint Joseph's College in Rensselaer, Indiana where Tim Lester, his arena football roommate, had just been hired as the head coach. When Lester left after one season to become quarterbacks coach at Western Michigan under new head coach Bill Cubit, Esposito succeeded Lester as head coach at Saint Joseph's.

Esposito coached at Saint Joseph's for five seasons, from 2005–2009. During his tenure, Saint Joseph's became a member of the Great Lakes Football Conference and won the conference twice. Esposito's overall record at Saint Joseph's was 29–25. Following the conclusion of the 2009 season, Esposito resigned to become the defensive line coach at Western Michigan under Cubit (Lester had left WMU several years prior). A. J. Ricker, the offensive line coach, succeeded him at Saint Joseph's.

Esposito left Western Michigan after the 2012 season, heading an hour and a half north up U.S. Route 131 to become defensive coordinator at Ferris State in Big Rapids, Michigan, succeeding Ryan Oshnock. He stayed at Ferris State for a single year before accepting the head coaching job at Davenport University in Grand Rapids, Michigan, roughly halfway between Big Rapids and Kalamazoo. Esposito was Davenport's first head coach and oversaw the recruiting of its initial class, a practice season in 2015, and the program's first full season in 2016, during which he compiled a record of 6–5. After that initial season, Esposito resigned to return to Western Michigan, this time as defensive coordinator under his old roommate Tim Lester, who had just been hired as the head coach there, replacing P. J. Fleck.

Head coaching record

References

External links
 Western Michigan profile

Year of birth missing (living people)
Living people
Af2 coaches
American football offensive linemen
Davenport Panthers football coaches
Ferris State Bulldogs football coaches
Memphis Tigers football players
Memphis Xplorers players
Saint Joseph's Pumas football coaches
Western Michigan Broncos football coaches
Manalapan High School alumni
People from Manalapan Township, New Jersey